Baidyanath Rath (14 April 1911 – 2 March 2007) was an Indian politician. He was a Member of Parliament, representing Odisha in the Rajya Sabha the upper house of India's Parliament as a member of the Communist Party of India. Rath died on 2 March 2007, at the age of 95.

References

1911 births
2007 deaths
Communist Party of India politicians from Odisha
Rajya Sabha members from Odisha